Raton is a city and the county seat of Colfax County in northeastern New Mexico. The city is located just south of Raton Pass. The city is also located about 6.5 miles south of the New Mexico–Colorado border and 85 miles west of Texas.

History

Ratón is the Spanish word for mouse.

Raton Pass had been used by Spanish explorers and Native Americans for centuries to cut through the rugged Rocky Mountains, and the mountain branch of the Santa Fe Trail cuts through the city, along what is now Business I-25.

The post office at this location was named Willow Springs from 1877 to 1879, Otero from 1879 to 1880, then renamed Raton in 1880.

Raton was founded at the site of Willow Springs, a stop on the Santa Fe Trail. The original  for the Raton townsite were purchased from the Maxwell Land Grant in 1880. In 1879, the Atchison, Topeka and Santa Fe Railway bought a local toll road and established a busy rail line. Raton quickly developed as a railroad, mining, and ranching center for the northeast part of the New Mexico territory, as well as the county seat and principal trading center of the area.

Geography
Raton is located at  (36.897082, -104.439912). The Raton Range and Raton Peak are located immediately north of the town. The Raton Range is a  ridge that extends east from the Sangre de Cristo Mountains. Raton Pass and the Raton Basin are also named for the Raton Range.

Geology

Raton is one of the famous sites for viewing the Cretaceous–Paleogene boundary, also known as the K-Pg or K-T boundary, or the iridium layer. A well-preserved sequence of rocks spans the K-T boundary in Climax Canyon Park, a Raton city park to the west of town. Geographic Coordinates: 

The rocks have been studied for evidence of the iridium anomaly cited as evidence of a large meteorite impact at the end of the Cretaceous. It is interpreted to have caused the Cretaceous–Paleogene extinction event, which killed off nonavian dinosaurs and many other species of flora and fauna 66 million years ago. The K-T boundary is represented in the rock strata by a 1-cm-thick tonstein clay layer which has been found to contain anomalously high concentrations of iridium.

Climate

Demographics

As of the United States Census of 2000, 7,282 people, 3,035 households, and 1,981 families were residing in the city. The population density was 992.4 people per square mile (383.1/km). The 3,472 housing units averaged of 473.2 per square mile (182.6/km). The racial makeup of the city was 78.04% White, 0.23% African American, 1.59% Native American, 0.40% Asian, 16.20% from other races, and 3.53% from two or more races. Hispanics or Latinos of any race were 56.96% of the population.

Of the 3,035 households, 30.7% had children under the age of 18 living with them, 47.0% were married couples living together, 12.9% had a female householder with no husband present, and 34.7% were not families. About 30.6% of all households were made up of individuals, and 14.1% had someone living alone who was 65 years of age or older. The average household size was 2.35, and the average family size was 2.92.

In the city, the population was distributed as 25.1% under the age of 18, 7.8% from 18 to 24, 24.9% from 25 to 44, 23.9% from 45 to 64, and 18.4% who were 65 years of age or older. The median age was 40 years. For every 100 females, there were 94.5 males. For every 100 females age 18 and over, there were 92.1 males.

The median income for a household in the city was $27,028, and for a family was $31,762. Males had a median income of $24,946 versus $18,433 for females. The per capita income for the city was $14,223. About 14.8% of families and 17.4% of the population were below the poverty line, including 25.2% of those under age 18 and 10.4% of those age 65 or over.

In the United States Census of 2010, the population of Raton had dropped to 6,885, and was estimated to have dropped to 6,066 by July 1, 2018.

In the United States Census of 2020, the population of Raton had dropped to 6,041.

Transportation

Roads
  I-25
  US 64
  US 87

Rail
 Raton Amtrak Station is a stop on the Southwest Chief route.

Air
 Raton Municipal Airport

Recreation
Activities there include camping, fishing, and hiking.

It is the largest National Rifle Association shooting range in the US. It hosts national competitions; high-powered rifle and skeet shooting are available.

Run to Raton, a motorcycle rally that includes camp-outs, vendors, free music, and a pin-up contest, takes place every July.

Raton was the site of New Mexico's first horse racetrack, La Mesa Park, which closed in 1992.

Raton is home to the International Balloon Rally, a hot-air balloon gathering, held on the Fourth of July weekend.

Notable people
 Tom W. Blackburn, writer who also wrote the lyrics to "The Ballad of Davy Crockett"
 Edwin Fullinwider, Olympic fencer
 Noel Mazzone, former offensive coordinator for the University of Arizona football team, current offensive coordinator for New Orleans Breakers of the new USFL
 Paul L. Modrich received the Nobel Prize in Chemistry in 2015
 John Morrow, United States Representative from New Mexico
 John R. Sinnock, United States Mint engraver known for work on the FDR dime
 Petro Vlahos, three-time Academy Award-winning Hollywood special-effects pioneer
 Robert W. Warren, attorney general of Wisconsin
 Bennie L. Woolley, Jr., racehorse trainer who won the 2009 Kentucky Derby

Notable group
 The Fireballs, rock and roll group known for "Sugar Shack" and "Bottle of Wine".

See also
 Folsom Falls
 National Old Trails Road
 Raton Downtown Historic District

References

Further reading

External links

 
 Raton Municipal Airport
 Raton Chamber & Economic Development Council
 
 

 
Cities in Colfax County, New Mexico
Cities in New Mexico
County seats in New Mexico